Gelechia delapsa is a moth of the family Gelechiidae. It is found in Brazil.

References

Moths described in 1931
Gelechia